Carbohydrate Polymers is a peer-reviewed scientific journal that covers the entire scope of carbohydrate polymers and the research and exploitation of polysaccharides. The journal is published by Elsevier.

Abstracting and indexing 
The journal is abstracted and indexed in several databases including:

 Science Citation Index
 Web of Science
 Polymer Contents

According to the Journal Citation Reports, the journal has a 2021 impact factor of 10.723.

References

External links 

 

Organic chemistry journals
Carbohydrate chemistry
Elsevier academic journals